Kishanda is a valley and national reserve for elephants in Tanzania. The reserve is part of the Rumanyika-Karagwe National Park created in 2019 and located in Kagera Region west of Lake Victoria.

Location

References 

Nature reserves in Tanzania
Protected areas of Tanzania
Important Bird Areas of Tanzania